Namak New Town refers to a planned city surrounding Buju-dong, Samhyang-dong of Mokpo, and Samhyang-eup, Illo-eup of Muan County.

New towns in South Korea
Mokpo
Muan County
New towns started in the 2000s